Lists of Indian film clans include:

List of Hindi film clans
List of South Indian film families
List of Telugu film families

See also
List of Indian music families

Sibling filmmakers
Film clans